Greenstone TV (or simply Greenstone) is a New Zealand-based television production company who produce factual, entertainment, drama and documentary television programs. Productions have been made for TVNZ 1, TVNZ 2, Three and Prime in New Zealand, and the Seven Network in Australia.

Greenstone was founded in 1994 by John Harris. In December 2013, Greenstone was purchased by Australian company CJZ (Cordell Jigsaw Zapruder) creating an independent international production group. Greenstone’s Chairman is Richard Driver, appointed in 2017.

Notable programs produced by Greenstone include long-running factual series Motorway Patrol, Highway Patrol, Neighbours at War, Border Patrol, Dog Squad and Coastwatch.

In 1998, Greenstone was awarded a Bravo award by the New Zealand Skeptics for The Mighty Moa.

Productions

Drama
The Cul de Sac
Secret Agent Men 
 The Amazing Extraordinary Friends 
 Bella 
 My Life Is Murder

Factual / reality series
The Big Ward 2015 NZ On Air funded for TV2 
Highway Cops (2012–Present) Series 3
Renters (2009–Present) Series 5
Coastwatch Oz (January 2014 – January 2015) Season 1
Dog Squad (2008–Present) Series 7
Border Patrol (2009–Present) Series 7
Highway Patrol (September 2009 – Present) Series 8
Motorway Patrol (September 1999 – Present) Series 16
The Zoo Series 1 - 12
Crash Investigation Unit (August 2008 - July 2011) Seasons 2
Emergency
Neighbours at War (2005–Present) Series 8
School of Home Truths
Fighting Fat
Serious Crash Unit (2001 - 2015) Series 7
Going Going Gone
Ask Your Auntie
Special Investigators
The Tem Show
Mike King Tonight
How’s Life?
Secret New Zealand
Mercury Lane
Epitaph 
Shipwreck
Guess Who’s Coming to Dinner?

Factual / reality series

Documentaries
The Women of Pike River
Decades In Colour" 2015 
The Kiwi Who Saved Britain: The Keith Park Story 
Stolen Memories 
Fatal Fires
Baby Charlotte
One of a Kind – Baby Keegan
BIG
Private Lives of Little People
To Hell and Back - Tanjas’ story
Cave Creek - The Full Story of a National Tragedy
Back from the Dead - The Saga of the Rose Noelle
Crump
Do or die - Lost in the Bush
Secrets of Car Thieves
The Business of Burglary.

References

External links
 Greenstone TV website
 IMDB entry

Film production companies of New Zealand
Television production companies of New Zealand
Mass media in Auckland
New Zealand companies established in 1994
Mass media companies established in 1994